The Americas Zone was one of the three regional zones of the 1974 Davis Cup.

12 teams entered the Americas Zone split across two sub-zones, the North & Central America Zone and the South America Zone. 9 teams played in the preliminary rounds, competing to advance to the main draw and join the remaining 3 teams which advanced to the main draw directly. The winners of each sub-zone main draw then played against each other to determine who moved to the Inter-Zonal Zone to compete against the winners of the Eastern Zone and Europe Zone.

Colombia defeated the United States in the North & Central America Zone final, and South Africa defeated Chile in the South America Zone final. In the Americas Inter-Zonal Final, South Africa defeated Colombia and progressed to the Inter-Zonal Zone.

North & Central America Zone

Preliminary rounds

Draw

First round
Caribbean/West Indies vs. Canada

Qualifying round
Mexico vs. Canada

Colombia vs. Venezuela

Main Draw

Draw

Semifinals
Colombia vs. Mexico

Final
Colombia vs. United States

South America Zone

Preliminary rounds

Draw

First round
Ecuador vs. Uruguay

Brazil vs. South Africa

Qualifying round
Ecuador vs. South Africa

Main Draw

Draw

Final
Chile vs. South Africa

Americas Inter-Zonal Final
Colombia vs. South Africa

Notes

References

External links
Davis Cup official website

Davis Cup Americas Zone
Americas
Davis Cup
Davis Cup
Davis Cup
Davis Cup
Davis Cup